Mi defensa is an autobiography written in 1843 in pamphlet form by Domingo Faustino Sarmiento, a writer and journalist who became the seventh president of Argentina.

Theme 
This was Sarmiento's first autobiography and it was written in pamphlet form. It omits any substantial information or recognition of his illegitimate daughter Ana. This would have discredited Sarmiento as a respected father of Argentina, as Sarmiento portrays himself as a sole individual, disregarding or denouncing important ties to other people and groups in his life.

References 

1843 non-fiction books
Works by Domingo Faustino Sarmiento
Argentine autobiographies